Wojcieszyce is a village situated along National Road 3 in the administrative district of Gmina Stara Kamienica, within Jelenia Góra County, Lower Silesian Voivodeship, in south-western Poland. Prior to 1945 it was in Germany. From 1975 to 1998, it was part of Jelenia Góra Voivodeship.

The village has a population of 1,181 as of 2011.

According to the National Heritage Board of Poland's registry, there are two historical sites in the village; The Church of Saint Barbara, built around 1761, and a Protestant church built in 1775.

References

Wojcieszyce